Jadunia is a genus of flowering plants belonging to the family Acanthaceae.

Its native range is New Guinea.

Species:

Jadunia biroi 
Jadunia racemiflora

References

Acanthaceae
Acanthaceae genera